Rashid Abdul Mugeez, professionally known as Mugeez, is a Ghanaian singer and songwriter. Born in Bimbila (Northern region, Ghana) he became known through the influential Afrobeats/Hiplife duo R2Bees (Refuse to Be Broke), which he formed with his cousin Faisal Hakeem (aka Omar Sterling) in 2007. The last album of R2Bees titled Site 15 from 2019 made it into the top 10 on the Billboard Chart. He has also worked with Ed Sheeran on Boa Me. In April 2019, Mugeez founded his record label Extrial Music to promote his solo projects, as well as up-and-coming artists.

Early life 
Rashid Abdul Mugeez developed a love of rap while attending school which led to him and his cousin forming R2Bees in 2007.The duo released their debut album, Da Revolution, in 2009. A follow-up, Da Revolution II, came in 2012, before the pair were nominated for Best International Act at the 2013 BET Awards. Various R2Bees singles appeared over the next few years while Mugeez also struck out on his own, featuring on singles by the likes of Criss Waddle, Mr. Eazi, and DJ Breezy. In 2017, he was featured on Fuse ODG's single "Boa Me," alongside Ed Sheeran. The two cousins lived in the same house and also attended the same primary, junior and senior secondary schools in Tema. Beginning their career early, they started off representing their school in school music contests. This led them to participating in the popular radio competition Kasahare, which they won. Their continued performance gained them popularity within their community.

Career

2007–2012: Foundation of R2Bees and "Da Revolution" – First Album R2Bees 
In 2007, both cousins officially formed the music duo R2Bees in Ghana. Mugeez is the lead vocalist of R2Bees, while Omar Sterling is the rapper, as well as CEO of R2Bees Entertainment. KillBeatz's Joseph Addison is R2Bees’ official producer. R2Bees’ lyrics are in Twi and Ghanaian Pidgin English and their music is a mixture of Afrobeats and Hiplife, a Ghanaian music style that fuses Ghanaian culture and Hip Hop.

2019: Foundation of Extrial Music 
After the Site 15 album featuring Afrobeats artists Wizkid and Burna Boy, as well as King Promise and Kwesi Arthur with tracks like "Over", "Sunshine", "Yesterday" and "My Baby". Mugeez founded the record label Extrial Music, to promote his own solo projects, as well as supporting up-and-coming artists. Kicking things off, Mugeez released the singles "Regular" with Sarkodie and "Your Number" with Juls and King Promise. Mugeez also signed Tecknikal, an artist from Ghana, as the first artist under his record label. After the foundation of Extrial in April 2019, Mugeez teamed up with DJ Mic Smith and Kwesi Arthur to release the single "Dripping". "Chihuahua" is Mugeez first solo single in 2020 and was released on 27 March after an exclusive pre-release on Audiomack. On 8 May 2020. "Six In Da Morning" released.

Awards and nominations

BET Awards

|-
|BET Awards 2013
|rowspan="1"|R2Bees
|rowspan="1"|Best International Act: Africa
|

Ghana Music Awards

|-
|rowspan="3"|2015
|rowspan="1"|R2Bees
|Group of the year
|
|- 
|rowspan="1"|Lobi
|Highlife song of the year
|
|-
|rowspan="1"|Killing me softly 
|Afro pop song of the year
|
|-
|rowspan="5"|2014
|rowspan="3"|R2Bees
|Group of the year 
|
|-
|Hiplife/ Hip Hop Artiste of the Year
|
|-
|Artist of the year
|
|-
|rowspan="2"|"Slow down"
|Best Collaboration of the Year
|
|-
|Vodafone Song of the Year
| 
|-
|rowspan="9"|2013
|rowspan="3"|R2Bees
|Artiste of the Year 
|
|-
|Hiplife/ Hip Hop Artiste of the Year 
|
|-
|Group of the Year
|
|-
| Slow down
|Best Collaboration of the Year
|
|-
|Life
|Vodafone song of the Year
|
|-
|"Odo"
|Highlife Song of the Year
|
|-
|rowspan="1"|Bayla Trap
|Hip Life/Hip Hop Song of the Year
|
|-
|rowspan="1"|Odo
|Male Vocal Performance
|
|-
|rowspan="1"|Mugeez
|Song Writer of the Year 
|
|-
|rowspan="3"|2011
|rowspan="2"|Kiss your hand 
|Afro pop song of the year
|
|-
|Collaboration of the year
|
|-
|rowspan="1"|R2Bees 
|Hip pop/Hiplife artist of the Year
|

The Headies

|-
| style="text-align:center;"|2013
|rowspan="2"|R2Bees
|rowspan="2"|Best African Artiste
|
|-
| style="text-align:center;"|2014
|

Nigeria Entertainment Awards

|-
| style="text-align:center;"|2013
|rowspan="2"|R2Bees
|Western African Artist or Group of the Year
|
|-
| style="text-align:center;"|2014
|African Artist of the Year (Non-Nigerian)
|

Selected videography

References

External links

Dagbani-language singers
Ghanaian musicians
People from Tema